Rønvik Church is a parish church of the Church of Norway in Bodø Municipality in Nordland county, Norway. It is located in the northern part of the town of Bodø. It is one of two churches for the Kjerringøy og Rønvik parish which is part of the Bodø domprosti (deanery) in the Diocese of Sør-Hålogaland. The orange/tan church was built out of brick and concrete in a circular style in 1997 using plans drawn up by the architect Reidar Berg. The church seats about 500 people. The building was consecrated on 30 November 1997.

See also
List of churches in Sør-Hålogaland

References

Churches in Bodø
Churches in Nordland
Wooden churches in Norway
20th-century Church of Norway church buildings
Churches completed in 1997
1997 establishments in Norway
Fan-shaped churches in Norway